Darin McBeath (born 17 June 1976) is a Canadian former alpine skier who competed in the 2002 Winter Olympics.

References

1976 births
Living people
Canadian male alpine skiers
Olympic alpine skiers of Canada
Alpine skiers at the 2002 Winter Olympics